Frank Clifford Wykoff (October 29, 1909 – January 1, 1980) was an American athlete, triple gold medal winner in 4 × 100 m relay at the Olympic Games.

Career

Born in Des Moines, Iowa, Frank Wykoff has a place in track and field history by being the first man to ever win three Olympic relay gold medals, all in world record time.

Wykoff made his debut at the Olympic Games in Amsterdam, where he finished fourth in the 100 m and ran an opening leg in the American 4 × 100 m relay team, which equalled the world record of 41.0 seconds in the final.

After the Olympics, in 1929, Wykoff enrolled at Glendale Community College. He enrolled for one year to be able to train one more season with his Glendale High School coach, Normal Hayhurst. He was close to death the previous fall with a severe throat infection but recovered enough in the spring to tie the world record four times as a sprinter for Glendale. He then transferred to the University of Southern California where he came under the tutelage of the famous coach Dean Cromwell. He won the AAU championships in 100 yd in 1928 and 1931 and the NCAA championships in 100 yd in 1930 and 1931. He ran a new world record in 100 yd of 9.4 s in May, 1930 and repeated it a month later. In 1931, as an anchor of the University of Southern California 4 × 100 m relay team, he helped set a new world record of 40.8.  While at USC, Wykoff became a member of the Kappa Alpha Order national fraternity.

At the 1932 Summer Olympics, Wykoff ran the anchor leg for the American 4 x 100 m relay team, which set a new world record of 40.0 seconds. At the 1936 Summer Olympics he again finished fourth in 100 m and again anchored the American 4 × 100 m relay team to gold with a new world record of 39.8.

Following his graduation from USC in 1932 Wykoff earned a master's degree in 1936 and became a teacher and administrator. Wykoff worked for the Los Angeles County school system until retiring in 1972. Frank Wykoff died in Altadena, California, aged 70.

A slogan of Wykoff's, "Clean Speech, Clean Sport, Clean Scholarship, Clean Life," was adopted by the YMCA in 1938.

His medals can be viewed in Los Angeles, CA by contacting la84
Org

References

External links
Tribute site (archived)
Glendale Community College Hall of Fame, Frank Wykoff

1909 births
1980 deaths
American male sprinters
Athletes (track and field) at the 1928 Summer Olympics
Athletes (track and field) at the 1932 Summer Olympics
Athletes (track and field) at the 1936 Summer Olympics
Olympic gold medalists for the United States in track and field
University of Southern California alumni
Sportspeople from Des Moines, Iowa
Track and field athletes from California
USC Trojans men's track and field athletes
Medalists at the 1936 Summer Olympics
Medalists at the 1932 Summer Olympics
Medalists at the 1928 Summer Olympics
USA Outdoor Track and Field Championships winners